Catherine Field is a suburb of Sydney and part of the Macarthur Region in the state of New South Wales, Australia. Catherine Field is 43 kilometres south-west of the Sydney central business district, in the local government area of Camden Council.

History
The area now known as Catherine Field (or Catherine Fields) was originally home to the Muringong, southernmost of the Darug people. In 1805 John Macarthur established his property at Camden where he raised merino sheep.

Catherine Field Post Office opened on 1 July 1963 and closed in 1996.

Catherine Field also contains a pre-school, a cricket oval and community hall.

Catherine Field was home to a theme park called El Caballo Blanco in the 1980s.

It is on the outskirts of south west Sydney and is about 20 minutes without traffic to Campbelltown.

Heritage listings 
Catherine Field has a number of heritage-listed sites, including:
 1025 Camden Valley Way: Raby, Catherine Field

Population
According to the 2016 census, there were 1,657 residents in Catherine Field. 67.8% of people were born in Australia and 65.8% of people spoke only English at home. The most common response for religion was Catholic at 48.0%.

Politics 
Catherine Field is part of the north ward of Camden Council represented by David Funnell (currently deputy mayor of Camden), Cindy Cagney and Peter Johnson. Chris Patterson is currently the local mayor. The suburb is contained within the federal electorate of Macarthur, represented by former ultra-marathon runner Pat Farmer (Liberal), and the state electorate of Camden, currently held by former mayor Geoff Corrigan (Labor).

References

Suburbs of Sydney
Camden Council (New South Wales)